The Internationale Hegelgesellschaft e.V. (International Hegel Society) claims to be Germany's oldest surviving Hegel Society. It was founded 1953 in Nürnberg by Wilhelm Raimund Beyer (1902-1990).

Mr. Beyer's efforts were supported by the City of Nürnberg in its celebration of the facts that Hegel taught in Nürnberg and that Hegel's wife, Marie Tucher, was the daughter of a well-known Nürnberg family.

The society currently supports over a thousand members from its Berlin headquarters. The results of their meetings are published in the Hegel Jahrbuch (Hegel Yearbook) which is available at Akademie Verlag, Berlin.

External links
 Society website

1953 establishments in West Germany
Philosophical societies in Germany
Georg Wilhelm Friedrich Hegel
Organizations established in 1953